Astoria Regional Airport  is a joint civil-military public airport in Warrenton, three miles southwest of Astoria, in Clatsop County, Oregon. The airport is owned by the Port of Astoria and is the home of Coast Guard Air Station Astoria.

The airport has no airline flights. Flights to Portland International Airport were most recently provided by SeaPort Airlines from March 2008
until Spring of 2010. Until 1974-75 Astoria had flights on West Coast Airlines and its successors.

Federal Aviation Administration records say the airport had 1,851 passenger boardings (enplanements) in calendar year 2008, 1,531 in 2009 and 3,482 in 2010. The National Plan of Integrated Airport Systems for 2011–2015 categorized it as a general aviation facility based on  enplanements in 2008 (the commercial service category requires 2,500 per year) but it would be categorized as commercial service - non-primary based in enplanements in 2010.

Facilities
Astoria Regional Airport covers 870 acres (352 ha) at an elevation of 15 feet (5 m). It has two asphalt runways: 8/26 is 5,795 by 100 feet (1,766 x 30 m) and 14/32 is 4,996 by 100 feet (1,523 x 30 m).

In 2010 the airport had 38,721 aircraft operations, average 106 per day: 60% general aviation, 36% military, and 4% air taxi. 48 aircraft were then based at the airport: 79% single-engine, 6% multi-engine, 4% helicopter, 4% ultralight, and 6% military.

The airport houses a United States Coast Guard station with service and controls for three HH-60 helicopters and three motor life boat rescue stations located on the Oregon and Washington coasts.

See also 
 Coast Guard Air Station Astoria

References

External links 
 Warrenton-Astoria Regional Airport at Port of Astoria website
 Aerial image as of August 2000 from USGS The National Map
 

Airports in Clatsop County, Oregon
Astoria, Oregon